Chinese rock is a style of music.

Chinese rock may also refer to:
 Chinese Rocks, by The Heartbreakers and later by The Ramones
 Chinese scholar's rocks, small rocks appreciated by Chinese scholars

See also
Geology of China